W. E. Chilton II House is a historic home located at Charleston, West Virginia.  It is a neo-Georgian stone house designed by nationally known architect William Lawrence Bottomley and built in 1933, for W. E. Chilton II and his wife Nancy Ruffner Chilton.  The -story central block of the house is flanked symmetrically by single-story wings.
In front of the west facade is a 90 foot by 90 foot walled forecourt paved in flagstone and Belgian block and cobblestones that were originally used on Philadelphia streets.

It was listed on the National Register of Historic Places in 1984 as part of the South Hills Multiple Resource Area.

References

Colonial Revival architecture in West Virginia
Georgian Revival architecture in West Virginia
Houses completed in 1933
Houses in Charleston, West Virginia
Houses on the National Register of Historic Places in West Virginia
National Register of Historic Places in Charleston, West Virginia
Stone houses in West Virginia